Sir Brian Wellingham Windeyer  (7 February 1904 – 26 October 1994) was Professor of Therapeutic Radiology at the Middlesex Hospital Medical School, University of London, from 1942–69, Dean of school from 1954–67 and Vice-Chancellor of the University of London from 1969–72.

Early life and education
Windeyer was born in Turramurra near Sydney, Australia, to parents of British, and earlier Swiss origin. He was the youngest of seven children of Mabel Fuller Robinson (1864–1956), an orphan emigrant from London to Australia at the age of 18. In 1891 she married Richard Windeyer KC (1864–1957), a barrister. His grandfather was Sir William Charles Windeyer.

He attended Sydney Church of England Grammar School and then studied medicine at the University of Sydney obtaining MBBS in 1927.

Career
After time at Royal Prince Alfred Hospital, Sydney, he worked at the Fondation Curie in Paris from 1929–30.  He obtained a Diploma in Medical Radiology and Electrology 1933 at Cambridge University. He also obtained FRCS at the University of Edinburgh. In 1931 he became radium officer at the Middlesex Hospital and officer in charge of the Meyerstein Institute of Radiotherapy formed in 1936. This was at a time when radium and x-ray treatment were carried out by different clinical teams. In World War II he was director in the emergency medical service of Mount Vernon Hospital in Northwood, Middlesex. In 1942 he became the first professor of therapeutic radiology at the Middlesex. He helped found and became President of the Faculty of Radiologists (1949–52).

Personal life
He was married twice, first on 21 March 1928 to Joyce Ziele Russell (1903–1981). They had a son Michael (1933–) and daughter Joanne (1936–). He married second, in January 1948, Elspeth Anne Bowery and had three children, Francis (1949–), Kyla (1954–), and Elspeth (1957–).

He was knighted (KBE) in 1961. The Windeyer building, now the Windeyer Institute of Medical Sciences, of University College London with which the Middlesex Medical School merged, was named after him.

See also
 List of Vice-Chancellors of the University of London
 Radiation therapy
 History of radiation therapy

References

1904 births
1994 deaths
Vice-Chancellors of the University of London
Scientists from Sydney
University of Sydney alumni
Physicians of the Middlesex Hospital
People educated at Sydney Church of England Grammar School
Sydney Medical School alumni
Knights Commander of the Order of the British Empire